A total solar eclipse occurred at the Moon’s descending node of the orbit on Thursday, February 26, 1998. A solar eclipse occurs when the Moon passes between Earth and the Sun, thereby totally or partly obscuring the image of the Sun for a viewer on Earth. A total solar eclipse occurs when the Moon's apparent diameter is larger than the Sun's, blocking all direct sunlight, turning day into darkness. Totality occurs in a narrow path across Earth's surface, with the partial solar eclipse visible over a surrounding region thousands of kilometres wide. Totality was visible in the Galápagos Islands, Panama, Colombia, the Paraguaná Peninsula in northwestern Venezuela, all of Aruba, most of Curaçao and the northwestern tip of Bonaire (belonging to Netherlands Antilles which dissolved later), all of Montserrat, Guadeloupe and Antigua and Barbuda.

Related eclipses

Eclipses of 1998 
 A total solar eclipse on February 26.
 A penumbral lunar eclipse on March 13.
 A penumbral lunar eclipse on August 8.
 An annular solar eclipse on August 22.
 A penumbral lunar eclipse on September 6.

Solar eclipses 1997–2000

Saros 130

Metonic cycle

In popular culture 
The 2001 Japanese film Orozco the Embalmer briefly featured the total eclipse as seen from Colombia.

Notes

References

External links

Sites and Photos
 Venezuela. Prof. Druckmüller's eclipse photography site
 Aruba. Prof. Druckmüller's eclipse photography site
 Solar Corona Shape
  APOD 3/11/1998, A Total Eclipse of the Sun, totality from Venezuela.
  APOD 3/12/1998, Moon Shadow satellite animation, 2/1998.
 The 1998 Eclipse in Venezuela

Videos
 Total eclipse, 1998 February 26, Venezuela
 Aruba Eclipse - February 26, 1998
 Maracaibo eclipse solar 1998

1998 02 26
1998 in science
1998 02 26
February 1998 events
1998 in Panama
1998 in Colombia
1998 in Antigua and Barbuda